La Conejera is a wetland, part of the Wetlands of Bogotá, located in the locality Suba, Bogotá, Colombia.

Flora and fauna

Insects 
The dragonfly species Ischnura cruzi has been registered in La Conejera, as well as in Santa María del Lago and Metropolitan Park La Florida.

Birds 
La Conejera contains the second-most number of bird species of the wetlands of Bogotá, after Córdoba Wetland, with 95, of which 6 endemic. The habitat of the American coot has been studied in 2002. The floating pennywort (Hydrocotyle ranunculoides), present in various wetlands of Bogotá, proved essential for the bird.

Endemic species unique for this wetland are:

Panorama

See also 

Biodiversity of Colombia, Bogotá savanna, Thomas van der Hammen Natural Reserve
Wetlands of Bogotá

References

Bibliography

External links 
  Fundación Humedales de Bogotá
  Conozca los 15 humedales de Bogotá - El Tiempo

Wetlands of Bogotá